Three-bagger may refer to:

 Triple (baseball), a three-base hit in baseball
 Three-volume novel, three books by one author bound in one volume
 The Thorne Smith Three-Bagger, by Thorne Smith